William Arthur Patterson (13 September 1873 – 17 December 1939) was an Australian rules footballer who played for the Carlton Football Club both before and after the formation of the Victorian Football League (VFL).

Notes

External links 

Bill Patterson's profile at Blueseum

1873 births
1939 deaths
Australian rules footballers from Victoria (Australia)
Carlton Football Club players
Carlton Football Club (VFA) players